Arthur Osman Farquhar Stuart (1927–2002) was a Sierra Leonean medical doctor who was popularly referred to as the 'People's Doctor.'

Early life
Arthur Stuart was born in Freetown, Sierra Leone to Sierra Leonean parents, Arthur MacCarthy Stuart, a civil servant of Bahamian descent and Amy Hilda Stuart, née Farquhar of Barbadian descent.

Education
Stuart was educated at secondary schools and subsequently studied medicine at the Liverpool School of Tropical Medicine.

Career
Stuart was the first Sierra Leonean medical doctor to work at Hill Station, Sierra Leone and was subsequently a consultant physician at Connaught Hospital.

Death
Stuart died following a stroke in 2002.

References

Sierra Leone Creole people
People of Sierra Leone Creole descent
Sierra Leoneans of Bahamian descent
Farquhar family (Sierra Leone)
1927 births
2002 deaths